Northern Rangers Football Club is a soccer club which represents Launceston in the Northern Championship.  They previously competed in the second-tier NPL Tasmania, but they decided to drop back to the third tier after the 2018 season.  They continued to play in the third-tier Northern Championship, where their B team previously played.

The club also fields teams in all junior divisions, as well as women's teams. Northern Rangers play their home games at the NTCA Ground in Launceston, Tasmania.

The Northern Rangers entered a junior side under the name "Northern Tasmanian Christian Soccer League Rangers" in the 1996 season. The club first entered the Northern Premier League in 1999. The club finally arrived on 15 August 2009 when it won its first Northern Premier League title and repeated as champions in 2010 and 2012. It participated in the inaugural season of the National Premier Leagues Tasmania in 2013, having previously competed in the Northern Premier League

History
Northern Rangers formed in 1996 when a group of players playing amateur six-a-side competitions in Riverside decided to combine their teams to form one 11-a-side team and enter the NTJSA under the banner of the Northern Tasmanian Christian Soccer League Rangers (NTCSL Rangers). The players were all under 16.

Around 18 players formed the first Northern Rangers side. The team went through the 1996 season undefeated to win the under-16 premiership in its debut season against strong opposition.

The following years saw the rapid expansion of the club with two teams entered in 1997. In 1998 NRFC finished one in rankings but lost the McDonalds Cup to Launceston City FC in a dramatic penalty shoot out. 1998 produced one player who would become a household name at the NTCA in the future, Derek Schipper.

In 1999, most of the players were too old to play in the junior competitions, so it was decided to try to gain a position in the Northern Premier League, and the Northern Rangers were officially founded as a senior side.  Rangers finished with 2 wins and 2 draws in the seniors, 4 wins and 1 draw in the reserves. The under-17s took the premiership under the guidance of coach Mark Ackerly.

In 2000, Mark Ackerly took on the senior coaching role and with some key recruits in Damire Metric and his younger brother Goran both from Bosnia, Adam Whitemore, Tony Ludby and Seb Deak From George Town the side was strengthened and more consistency was achieved. The club also was able to reach the final in the statewide vase competition.

In 2003 Mark Spicer joined the club as the first contracted coach to the Northern Rangers. He helped the club finish in fourth place on the senior table two years running and third for the Reserves for the two years also. For the first time Northern Rangers were a consistent and challenging force in the Northern Premier League.

In 2007 the club's Reserves took the Northern Premier Reserve Grade Champions.

The club won its first Northern Premier League title on 15 August 2009 with a last minute winner against Devonport.  The club secured its second consecutive Northern Premier League on August the 7th 2010 with a 3-nil victory over Somerset at Cardigan Street with a week to spare.

The club secured its third title in four seasons on 18 August 2012, with a 4–1 home victory against Somerset.  In the same year the club was accepted into the inaugural Statewide Victory League.

They dropped down to the third tier Northern Championship following the 2018 season.

Seasons

Honours
Northern Championship Champions: 2009; 2010; 2012; 2019 
Northern Championship 1 Premiers: 2015
Forestry Tasmania State Final Series Runners up: 2010; 2012 
Milan Lakoseljac Statewide Cup Runners up: 2009 
Steve Hudson Cup Winners: 2006; 2014 
Northern Championship Women's Premiers: 2017; 2018

Records
Record Games holder
 Gabriel Tams 300+
 Marshall Pooley 250+
 Patrick Lanau-Atkinson 200+
 Derek Schipper 200+

Club Best and Fairest Winners Men's
1999:  Tim Armstrong
2000:  Derek Schipper
2001:  Derek Schipper /  Tim Schipper
2002:  Tim Schipper
2003:  Adam Whitemore
2004:  Sam Luck
2005:  Sam Luck
2006:  Derek Schipper
2007:  Thataetsile Kakadumane
2008:  Thataetsile Kakadumane /  Derek Schipper /  Mark Ambrose
2009:  Derek Schipper /  Todd Hingston
2010:  Todd Hingston
2011:  Derek Schipper
2012:  Chris Hunt
2013:  Todd Hingston /  Ryan McCarragher
2014:  Todd Hingston
2015:  Yitay Towns 
2016:  Harry Thannhauser
2017:  Harry Thannhauser
2018:  Harry Thannhauser /  Partrick Lanau-Atkinson

Club Best and Fairest Winners Women's
2007:  Arlene Crooks
2008:  Rebecca Wheatley
2009:  Arlene Crooks
2010:  Felicity Shaw
2011:  Felicity Shaw
2012:  Emma Langley
2013:  Emma Langley
2014:  Emma Langley
2015:  Becky Grennell
2016:  Emma Langley
2017:  Emma Langley
2018:  Mickayla Anderson

Individual honours
George Dale Medal Winner: Derek Schipper(2006), Todd Hingston(2009, 2010, 2011 & 2012)
2006: Tasmanian State team selection: Derek Schipper / Marshall Pooley
2007: Tasmanian State team selection: Thataetsile Kakadumane
2008: Tasmanian Youth A-League Team: Mark Ambrose / Marshall Pooley
Fred Paice Medal Winners (Best & Fairest Winners Reserve Comp): Gabriel Tams (2003, 2008, 2012), Oytun Aykiran (2004), Peter Mcbeath (2005, 2007), Marshall Pooley (2015,2017)
Under 18 League Best and Fairest winners: Stefan Jago (2009), Yitay Towns (2011)
Northern Premier League Coach of the Year: Mitchell Billing (2002), Roslan Sa'ad (2009), Adam Whitemore (2010)
Mitsubishi Medal Winners (Best & Fairest Winners PS4 National Premier League) : Yitay Towns (2015)

Life Members
 2000: David Hughes
 2003: James Park
 2005: Brendan Lichtendonk
 2008: Mark Ackerly
 2008: Ian Loft
 2011: Luke Connors
 2011: Derek Schipper
 2014: Marshall Pooley
 2014: Rod Fulton
 2018: Gabriel Tams

Club Presidents
 1999–2002: David Hughes
 2002–2011: Mark Ackerly
 2012–2016: Mark Jefferson
 2016: Coz Egberts
 2017–2019: Rod Fulton

Tresurer
1999–2004: James Park
2005–2006: Rod Fulton
2007–2017: Marshall Pooley
2018: Vaishali Harinandan
2019: Niki Fulton

Vice President
2008–2013: Luke Conners
2014: Mark Ackerly
2015: Rod Fulton 
2016–2017: Gary Harris-Newsham
2018: Marshall Pooley
2019: Tony MacNevin

Secretary

2003–2006: Jenny Pooley
2007: Tanya Cotrell
2008–2011: Brendan Lichtendonk
2012–2013: Mark Ackerly
2014–2019: Cherie Chugg

Coach Senior Men's Team
1999: David Hughes
2000–2002: Mark Ackerly
2003–2005: Mark Spicer
2006–2008: Mitch Billing
2009: Roslyn Saad
2010–2011: Adam Whitemore
2012: Peter MacBeath
2013: Peter Savill
2014: Tim Lunnon
2015–2016: Dane Hudson
2017–2018: Lino Scuilli
2019: Rod Fulton

Coach Senior Women's Team
2007–2010: John Crooks
2011–2013: Andrew Langley
2014: Josh Myer
2015–2018: Rod Fulton
2019: Ian Loft

Club Senior Men's Team Captain
1999: Jamie Cogger
2000–2001: Ben McKinnon
2002: Mitch Billing
2003–2004: Adam Whitemore
2005: Rohan Pooley
2006: Peter Mcbeath
2007: Rohan Pooley
2008 TT Kakadumane
2009–2011: Sam Luck
2012: Declan Cuschieri
2013–2014: Todd Hingston
2015–2018: Nick Lanau-Atkinson

Club Senior Women's Team Captain
2007–2009: Arlene Crooks
2010–2011: Sharelle Preston
2012–2014: Felicity Shaw
2015–2017: Emma Langley
2018–2019: Jess Loft

Senior Mens Team League records

First Senior Game played: 10 April 1999, against Launceston United at Birch Avenue.
First Senior win: 5 June 1999, Northern Rangers defeated George Town Utd. 5–2 at the NTCA.
Greatest Winning Margin:  14 August 2015, Northern Rangers defeated Glenorchy Knights 12–1 at NTCA Ground.
Greatest Losing Margin: 10 April 1999, Launceston United defeated Northern Rangers 14–2 at Birch Avenue.
Best Finish to a Season Men's: 2010, 1st place out of 9 with 12 wins, 3 draws, 1 loss, 56 goals for and 23 against.

Worst Finish to a season: 1999, 10th place out of 11 with 2 wins, 2 draws, 16 losses, 41 goals for and 111 against

Senior Women's Team League records

Best Finish to a Season Women's: 2017, 1st  place out of 8 teams

References

External links
Northern Rangers – official website

National Premier Leagues clubs
Soccer clubs in Tasmania
Association football clubs established in 1996
1996 establishments in Australia